Lockwood Viaduct is a stone railway bridge that carries the Huddersfield to Penistone Line across the River Holme, in West Yorkshire, England. One local challenge has been to "lob" a cricket ball over the viaduct, with some claiming that they have. The viaduct was completed in 1848 and is now a grade II listed structure.

History 
Lockwood Viaduct is a stone built railway viaduct that straddles the River Holme, the B6108 and the A616, in the village of Lockwood,  near Huddersfield in West Yorkshire. The viaduct was built between 1846 and 1848 by the Huddersfield and Sheffield Junction Railway (to a design by John Hawkshaw) carrying their railway south to Penistone and the branch to Holmfirth.

The viaduct cost £33,000 in 1849,, £3,000 of which was spent on the timber frames for the masonry. The 36-arch viaduct has been described as "soaring", especially when viewed from the ground level looking up. George Searle Phillips (a Huddersfield journalist in the 19th century), described it as being "One of the most stupendous structures of ancient or modern times. The impression is almost irresistible that it is the work of demi-gods and giants."

Cricket ball lobs 
One historical challenge regarding the viaduct is that of succeeding in throwing (or lobbing), a cricket ball over the viaduct. However, a railway historian cast doubt on this, and the local paper, in the interests of health and safety, dissuaded readers from trying to emulate the feat.

See also 
Denby Dale Viaduct, another viaduct on the same line

Notes

References

Sources

External links 
Lockwood Viaduct on Huddersfield Exposed

Grade II listed buildings in West Yorkshire
Railway viaducts in West Yorkshire
Bridges completed in 1850